Derek Bryant may refer to:
 Derek Bryant (boxer) (born 1971), American boxer
 Derek Bryant (baseball) (born 1951), American baseball player
 Derek Bryant (RAF officer) (born 1933), British Royal Air Force officer